Nor Mustafa (born 29 November 2001) is a Swedish professional footballer who plays as a forward for Hibernian. She spent the 2020–21 season in England with FA WSL club West Ham United. Mustafa is of Kurdish descent.

Club career

West Ham 
Mustafa joined West Ham in July 2020, becoming West Ham's fifth signing of the summer. Mustafa made her debut on 6 September coming on in the 81st minute in a 1–1 draw with Tottenham. She was transferred to French Division 2 Féminine club Le Havre in September 2021.

Career statistics

Club

Notes

References

External links

Nor Mustafa at Footofeminin.fr (in French)

2001 births
Living people
Swedish women's footballers
Sweden women's youth international footballers
Swedish expatriate footballers
Women's association football forwards
Eskilstuna United DFF players
West Ham United F.C. Women players
Damallsvenskan players
Women's Super League players
Swedish expatriate sportspeople in England
Expatriate women's footballers in England
Swedish expatriate sportspeople in France
Expatriate women's footballers in France
Swedish people of Kurdish descent
Le Havre AC (women) players
People from Eskilstuna
Sportspeople from Södermanland County